The Fragile Army is the third album from the symphonic-rock group The Polyphonic Spree. The album was released on TVT Records on June 19, 2007.

On April 26, 2007, an eight-minute-long mash-up preview of the album was made available as a free download.

On May 12, 2007, the entire album was leaked to various P2P networks. The leaked version of the album includes a song entitled "Section 27 (Oh I Feel Fine)". However, on the actual album Section 27 is a new version of the track "Mental Cabaret", which originally featured on the Wait EP.

There was also a deluxe version of the album released including a patch and a DVD. Additionally, there is a double vinyl available for sale that also includes a voucher for online download of the album in MP3 format.

The Fragile Army is the Polyphonic Spree's only record on which lead guitarist Annie Clark, better known as St. Vincent, appears as an official member of the band. Clark left the group shortly before the album's release. Pianist Mike Garson, best known for his work with David Bowie, was also part of the band's lineup during the recording.

Track listing 
All songs written by Tim DeLaughter, except where noted.
 "Section 21 (Together We're Heavy)" - 0:31
 "Section 22 (Running Away)" - 3:33
 "Section 23 (Get Up and Go)" - 3:54
 "Section 24 (The Fragile Army)" - 4:02
 "Section 25 (Younger Yesterday)" - 4:35
 "Section 26 (We Crawl)" - 3:29
 "Section 27 (Mental Cabaret)" - 3:00
 "Section 28 (Guaranteed Nightlite)" - 3:55
 "Section 29 (Light to Follow)" - 4:25
 "Section 30 (Watch Us Explode (Justify))" - 4:41
 "Section 31 (Overblow Your Nest)" - 4:48
 "Section 32 (The Championship)" - 5:50
 Bonus tracks on the Limited Edition (there is a Limited Edition without these bonus tracks):
 "Bonus Track (Lithium)" (Kurt Cobain)
 "Bonus Track (Checking Out)"

Personnel
Tim Delaughter - Lead vocals, additional guitars, keys, percussion
Mark Pirro - Bass
Bryan Wakeland - Drums, percussion
Ryan Fitzgerald - Electric and acoustic guitars
Annie Clark - Electric and acoustic guitars, keyboards, backing vocals
Mike Garson - Piano, keyboards, backing vocals 
Evan Hisey - Keyboards, samples
Audrey Easley - Flute, Piccolo, Electronic Wind Instrument
Rick Nelson - Violin, upright bass
Ricky Rasura - Classical Harp
Daniel Hart - Viola
Sara Donaldson - Cello
Louis Schwadron - French Horn
Mike St. Clair - Trombone
Logan Keese - Trumpet, cornet
Matt Bricker - Additional Trumpet
Mike Dillon - Vibraphone, additional percussion
Backing Vocals:
Jennefer Jobe-Penn
Julie Doyle
Kelly Repka
Jessica Jordan
Jenny Kirtland
Jennie Kelley
Apotsala Wilson

Charts

References

External links
 Official production blog
 

The Polyphonic Spree albums
2007 albums
TVT Records albums
Good Records albums
Albums produced by John Congleton